This article provides two lists:
A list of National Basketball Association players by total career regular season turnovers recorded.
A progressive list of turnover leaders showing how the record increased through the years.

Turnovers leaders
This is a list of National Basketball Association players by total career regular season turnovers recorded.
Statistics accurate as of March 16, 2023.

Progressive list of turnovers leaders
This is a progressive list of turnovers leaders showing how the record increased through the years.
Statistics accurate as of March 16, 2023.

See also
Basketball statistics
NBA regular season records

Notes

References

External links
Basketball-Reference.com enumeration of NBA career leaders in turnovers
National Basketball Association official website enumeration of NBA career leaders in turnovers

National Basketball Association lists
National Basketball Association statistical leaders